Bhurta, vorta, bhorta, or bharta is a lightly fried mixture of mashed vegetables (chakata) in the cuisine of Bangladesh, India, Nepal and Sri Lanka.

An example of this is Baingan Bartha.

Ingredients
Bhurta recipes vary depending upon the region and the vegetable(s) used. In general, the ingredients are as follows:
A vegetable, such as aloo (potato), baingan (eggplant), or karela (bitter melon)
Tamatar (tomato) or pyaz (onion)
Chaunk (Tempered spices)

Gallery

See also

 South Asian cuisine
 List of vegetable dishes

References

Indian cuisine
Bengali cuisine
Indian vegetable dishes
Pakistani cuisine
Bihari cuisine